Murrumbidgee Irrigation Limited (MI) is one of five privately owned irrigation companies in New South Wales, Australia. It provides irrigation water and drainage services to an area known as the Murrumbidgee Irrigation Area (MIA). MI manages 500 million of infrastructure assets, has an annual turnover of $40 million, and services over 2.5 billion in water entitlements.

History
The Murrumbidgee Irrigation Area (MIA) was established in 1912 following the commissioning of Burrinjuck Dam  in the New South Wales Snowy Mountains. The MIA was originally conceived primarily as a gravitational irrigation system near the Murrumbidgee River at Yanco, New South Wales. Further expansion occurred in the 1970s with the completion of the Snowy Mountains Scheme and construction of the Blowering Dam. In 1999 the MIA and Districts was formally separated from the ownership by the Government of New South Wales and now operates as an unlisted public company (limited by permanent shares owned by its customers - the local irrigators).

References

External links
 Murrumbidgee Irrigation Limited homepage

Privately held companies of Australia
Riverina
 
Irrigation in Australia
Water management in New South Wales
Water companies of New South Wales
Companies based in New South Wales
Irrigation companies
Agriculture companies of Australia